Morat may refer to:

 Morat, Switzerland, or Murten, a town in Switzerland
 Battle of Morat (1476), between the Swiss Federation and Charles I, Duke of Burgundy
 Morat (band), a Colombian folk band
 Morat, a type of mead that uses mulberries. See mead#List of mead variants.

People with the surname
 Jean-Pierre Morat (1846–1920), French physiologist
 Philippe Morat (born 1937), French botanist
 Rose Morat (1906–2013), American mugging victim